Giovanni Luigi Reda (born February 6, 1974) is a photographer, videographer, director and skate personality internationally recognized for his work in skateboarding.

Early life 
Reda is from Mill Basin, Brooklyn, and went to college in Atlanta. Reda talks with a strong New York accent and is known for his sarcasm and insulting humor.

Skateboarding

The Berrics 
As of 2012, Reda is the staff photographer for the skateboarding website The Berrics. From 2008 to 2011, Reda produced and starred in a weekly video known as Wednesdays With Reda. In this show, he typically interviews people associated with the skateboarding industry, although he has done episodes involving celebrities or actors. Reda's last Wednesdays with Reda was in 2017.

Before working at The Berrics, Reda worked for multiple magazines, including Big Brother, Transworld Skateboarding, and Skateboarder Magazine. Reda was also the chief photographer of the Zoo York skate team for a while. In the 2000s, Giovanni Reda won Transworld Skateboarding Magazine's Photographer of the Year award (P.O.T.Y.).

Games 
Reda is also known for his appearance in the 2007 - 2010 series Skate. In all games excluding Skate 3, he appears as the cameraman. He records you doing the main goal of the games: get coverage from The Skateboard Mag and Thrasher.

References

External links 

 Berrics bio 
 Transworld - Interview
 Reda's Bobshirt interview

American skateboarders
Skate photographers
1974 births
Living people